Improvement is the process of a thing moving from one state to a state considered to be better.

Improvement also may refer to:

 Business process improvement
 Continual improvement
 Kaizen, a Japanese-style continuous business improvement 
 Focused improvement
 Home improvement, the process or result of improving the efficiency, livability, or market value of a personal dwelling
 Improvement commissioners, a form of government in 18th-century Britain
 Improvement Era, magazine of the Church of Jesus Christ of Latter-day Saints published from 1897 to 1970
 Improvement trust
 Land improvement
 Natural vision improvement, a regimen developed by William Horatio Bates for improving human vision
 Performance improvement
 Preemphasis improvement
 Quality improvement

See also
 Emendation (taxonomy), a scientific change to the name of a living organism
 Improvement and Development Agency, a British governmental agency established in 1998
 Improvement district (disambiguation)